"The king is dead, long live the king!" is a traditional proclamation made following the accession of a new monarch in various countries. The seemingly contradictory phrase simultaneously announces the death of the previous monarch and assures the public of continuity by saluting the new monarch.

More recently, this phrase has become a popular phrasal template. Given the memorable nature of the phrase (owing, in part, to epanalepsis), as well as its historic significance, the phrase crops up regularly as a headline for articles, editorials, or advertisements on themes of succession or replacement. Robert Cecil, one of the architects of the League of Nations, famously concluded his speech at the final session of the League of Nations with the phrase: "The League is dead. Long live the United Nations."

Origin 

In France, the declaration was traditionally made by the Duke of Uzès, a senior peer of France, as soon as the coffin containing the remains of the previous king descended into the vault of Saint Denis Basilica. The phrase arose from the law of —that the transfer of sovereignty occurs instantaneously upon the moment of death of the previous monarch. "The King is dead" is the announcement of a monarch who has just died. "Long live The King!" refers to the heir who immediately succeeds to a throne upon the death of the preceding monarch.

At the time, French was the primary language of the nobility in England, and the proclamation was quickly taken up as ideally representing the same tradition—which in England dates back to 1272, when Henry III died while his son, Edward I, was fighting in the Crusades. To avoid any chance of a war of succession erupting over the order of succession, the Royal Council proclaimed: "The throne shall never be empty; the country shall never be without a monarch." Thus, Edward was declared king immediately, and he reigned in absentia until news of his father's death reached him and he returned to England.  Another example is among the French royalty. In France, Louis XV was the predecessor of Louis XVI.  Upon Louis XV's death at around 11:00 pm on 10 May 1774, heir-apparent Louis-Auguste, le Dauphin, immediately became King Louis XVI of France.  This quick transition of sovereignty was made within the phrase "the king is dead, long live the king!"

Usage 
In Denmark, the prime minister makes a similar proclamation upon the death of a monarch—Kongen leve, kongen er død (hail the king, the king is dead)—from the balcony of Christiansborg Palace (the Danish Parliament building). This declaration is official and marks the ascension of a new monarch immediately after the death of the old. This is because Frederick III abolished the coronation ceremony with the introduction of the hereditary and absolute monarchy in 1660. The king was now supreme and accountable only to God, so the crown became a birthright, and not something to be bestowed only after the father's death with the nobles' and the church's approval. With the introduction of constitutional monarchy in 1849, the monarch's power over the State was again limited, but his claim to the throne remained undisputed and absolute.

In some monarchies, such as the United Kingdom, an interregnum is usually avoided by using the idea of immediate transferral of power behind the phrase (i.e., the heir to the throne becomes a new monarch immediately on his predecessor's death). This famous phrase signifies the continuity of sovereignty, attached to a personal form of power named Auctoritas. This is not so in some other monarchies where the new monarch's reign begins only with coronation or some other formal or traditional event. In the Polish–Lithuanian Commonwealth for instance, kings were elected, which often led to relatively long interregna. During that time it was the Polish primate who served as an interrex (ruler between kings). Ernst Kantorowicz's famous theory of the king's two bodies (1957) showed how auctoritas (Kantorowicz used the synonym term—here—of dignitas) was transferred from the defunct sovereign to the new one.

"The King is dead, long live The King!" was last properly used in the United Kingdom in January 1936 when King George V was succeeded by his son King Edward VIII, who later abdicated.

In the Kingdom of Thailand, to conclude the national televised address on October 13, 2016, regarding the death of King Bhumibol Adulyadej, the Prime Minister proclaimed "His Majesty King Bhumibol Adulyadej, Rama IX, has passed away. Long live His Majesty the new King."

In the United Kingdom and other realms which permit female succession to the throne, the phrase can be altered to accommodate succession between monarchs of different sexes. This happened, for example in 1558, when Queen Mary I was succeeded by her half-sister, Queen Elizabeth I ("The Queen is dead, long live The Queen!"), or in 1952, when King George VI was succeeded by his daughter, Queen Elizabeth II ("The King is dead, long live The Queen!") or in 2022, when Queen Elizabeth II was succeeded by her son, King Charles III ("The Queen is dead, long live The King!")

Non-royal contexts
In other contexts, the phrase is frequently used and adapted as a phrasal template to form a snowclone, for example:

See also 

 Demise of the Crown
 The Queen Is Dead
 Ten thousand years, a similar East Asian saying, used to wish for long life of the Emperor
 Mabuhay, a traditional Philippine cheer meaning "May you live long!"
 Sto lat, a similar Polish phrase and song meaning "one hundred years"
 Mnohaya lita, "(God grant you) many years" (Ukrainian)
 Kimigayo, Anthem of Japan meaning "His Imperial Majesty's Reign"

Notes

References

Monarchy
Snowclones
State ritual and ceremonies
Proclamations
Continuity of government